Gamoneda is a surname. Notable people with the surname include: 

Ana Luisa Carvajal Gamoneda (born 1962), Cuban chess player
Antonio Gamoneda (born 1931), Spanish poet

See also
Gamoneda Formation, an Emsian geologic formation of southern Bolivia

Spanish-language surnames